Gary Boyd may refer to:

Gary Boyd (baseball) (born 1946), American baseball player
Gary Boyd (golfer) (born 1986), British golfer
Gary Boyd (sailor) (born 1972), Australian sailor